Altrincham (locally ) is a market town in Trafford, Greater Manchester, England, south of the River Mersey. At the 2011 Census, it had a population of 52,419.

Within the boundaries of the historic county of Cheshire, Altrincham was established as a market town in 1290, a time when the economy of most communities was based on agriculture rather than trade, and there is still a market in the town. Further socioeconomic development came with the extension of the Bridgewater Canal to Altrincham in 1765 and the arrival of the railway in 1849, stimulating industrial activity in the town. Outlying villages were absorbed by Altrincham's subsequent growth, along with the grounds of Dunham Massey Hall, formerly the home of the Earl of Stamford, and now a tourist attraction with three Grade I Listed Buildings and a deer park.

Altrincham has good transport links to Manchester, Sale, Stretford, Warrington and Stockport among other destinations. The town has a strong middle-class presence: there has been a steady increase in Altrincham's middle classes since the 19th century. It is also home to Altrincham F.C. and three ice hockey clubs: Manchester Storm, Altrincham Aces and Trafford Tornados.

History
Local evidence of prehistoric human activity exists in the form of two Neolithic arrowheads found in Altrincham, and, further afield, a concentration of artefacts around Dunham. The remains of a Roman road, part of one of the major Roman roads in North West England connecting the legionary fortresses of Chester (Deva Victrix) and York (Eboracum), run through the Broadheath area. As it shows signs of having been repaired, the road was in use for a considerable period of time. The name Altrincham first appears as "Aldringeham", probably meaning "homestead of Aldhere's people". As recently as the 19th century it was spelt both Altrincham and Altringham.

Until the Normans invaded England, the manors surrounding Altrincham were owned by the Saxon thegn Alweard; after the invasion they became the property of Hamon de Massey, though Altrincham is not mentioned in the Domesday Book of 1086. The earliest documented reference to the town is from 1290, when it was granted its charter as a Free Borough by Baron Hamon de Massey V. The charter, which exists and is held by Trafford MBC, allowed a weekly market to be held, and it is possible that de Massey established the town to generate income through taxes on trade and tolls. This suggests that Altrincham may have been a planned market town, unusual during the Middle Ages, when most communities were agricultural. Altrincham was probably chosen as the site of the planned town rather than Dunham – which would have been protected by Dunham Castle – because its good access to roads was important for trade.

Altrincham Fair became St James's Fair or Samjam in 1319 and continued until 1895. Fair days had their own court of Pye Powder (a corruption of the French for "dusty feet"), presided over by the mayor and held to settle disputes arising from the day's dealings. By 1348 the town had 120 burgage plots – ownership of land used as a measure of status and importance in an area – putting it on a par with the Cheshire town of Macclesfield and above Stockport and Knutsford. The earliest known residence in Altrincham was "the Knoll", on Stamford Street near the centre of the medieval town. A 1983 excavation on the demolished building, made by South Trafford Archaeological Group, discovered evidence that the house dated from the 13th or 14th century, and that it may have contained a drying kiln or malting floor. During the English Civil War, men from Altrincham fought for the Parliamentarian Sir George Booth. During the war, armies camped on nearby Bowdon Downs on several occasions.

In 1754, a stretch of road south of Altrincham, along the Manchester to Chester route, was turnpiked. Turnpikes were toll roads which taxed passengers for the maintenance of the road. Further sections were turnpiked in 1765 from Timperley to Sale, and 1821 from Altrincham to Stockport. The maintenance of roads passed to local authorities in 1888, although by then most turnpike trusts had already declined. The connection of the Bridgewater Canal to Altrincham in 1765 stimulated the development of market gardening, and for many years Altrincham was noted for its vegetables. By 1767, warehouses had been built alongside the canal at Broadheath, the first step in the development of Broadheath as an industrial area and the beginning of Altrincham's industrialisation. The canal was connected in 1776 to the River Mersey, providing the town not only with a water route to Manchester, but also to the Irish Sea.

Moves to connect the town to the UK's railway network gained pace in 1845, when the Act of Parliament for the construction of the Manchester South Junction and Altrincham Railway (MSJAR) was passed. The first train left Altrincham early on 20 July 1849, carrying 65 passengers. The MSJAR had two stations in the town: Altrincham, on Stockport Road, and Bowdon – though not actually in Bowdon – on Lloyd Street/Railway Street. Both were replaced in 1881 by Altrincham & Bowdon railway station on Stamford New Road. The London and North Western Railway's station at Broadheath, on the town's northern edge, was opened in 1854, while a further connection was created on 12 May 1862 by the Cheshire Midland Railway (later the Cheshire Lines Committee), who opened their line from Altrincham to Knutsford.

With its new railway links, Altrincham and the surrounding areas became desirable places for the middle classes and commuters to live. Professionals and industrialists moved to the town, commuting into Manchester. While some travelled daily by coach, the less well–to–do commuted by express or "flyer" barges from Broadheath. Between 1851 and 1881 the population increased from 4,488 to 11,250. By 1900 Broadheath had its own docks, warehouses and electricity generating station. The site's proximity to rail, canal and road links proved attractive to companies making machine tools, cameras and grinding machines. The presence of companies like Tilghmans Sand Blast, and the Linotype and Machinery Company, established Broadheath as an industrial area of national standing. By 1914, 14 companies operated in Broadheath, employing thousands of workers. One of those was the Budenberg Gauge Company. Linotype also created 172 workers' homes near its factory, helping cater for the population boom created by Broadheath's industrialisation. Between 1891 and 1901 the population of Altrincham increased by 35 per cent, from 12,440 to 16,831.

From the turn of the 20th century to the start of the Second World War, there were few changes in Altrincham. Although the town was witness to some of the Luftwaffe's raids on the Manchester area in the latter war, it emerged from the war relatively unscathed having lost only 23 civilian residents through enemy action,  and as with the rest of Britain, experienced an economic boom. This manifested itself in the construction of new housing and the 1960s rebuilding of the town centre. However, during the 1970s employment at Broadheath declined by nearly 40 per cent.

Governance

Altrincham became a free borough and a self-governing township when it was granted its charter in June 1290 by the Lord of the Manor, Hamon de Massey V. The charter allowed for the creation of a merchants' guild, run by the town's burgesses to tax people passing through the borough. Burgesses were free men who lived in the town. The borough was ruled by a Court Leet and elected a mayor since at least 1452. Amongst the court's responsibilities were keeping the public peace and regulating the markets and fairs.

The borough was not one of those reformed by the Municipal Corporations Act of 1835, and continued to exist under the control of the Lord of the Manor and the Court Leet until its final abolition in 1886. The Public Health Act of 1848 led to the creation of Altrincham's Local Board of Health in 1851 to address the unsanitary conditions created by the town's growing population – the first such board in Trafford.

The local board was reconstituted as an urban district council in the administrative county of Cheshire under the Local Government Act 1894. Altrincham Urban District was expanded in 1920 when parts of Carrington and Dunham Massey Civil Parishes were added. Altrincham Town Hall was designed by Charles Albert Hindle and completed in November 1901. A further expansion took place in 1936; Timperley Civil Parish was abolished and most of its area incorporated into Altrincham UD. At the same time, there was a minor exchange of areas with Hale Urban District; a minor addition from Bowdon Urban District; and a further substantial portion of Dunham Massey Civil Parish was added. In 1937 the urban district was granted a charter of incorporation and became a municipal borough. The new borough was granted armorial bearings which featured heraldic references to the Masseys and Earls of Stamford. With the passage of the Local Government Act 1972, the administrative counties and municipal boroughs were abolished and Altrincham became part of the Metropolitan Borough of Trafford in Greater Manchester on 1 April 1974.

Trafford Council is responsible for the administration of local services, such as education, social services, town planning, waste collection and council housing. The area is divided into seven electoral wards: Altrincham, Bowdon, Broadheath, Hale Barns, Hale Central, Timperley, and Village. These wards have 21 out of the 63 seats on the Trafford Council; as of the 2014 local elections fifteen of these seats were held by the Conservative Party, three by the Labour Party, and three by the Liberal Democrats. Altrincham was in the eponymous parliamentary constituency which was created in 1885. This lasted until 1945 when it was replaced by Altrincham and Sale. In 1997, this in turn became part of the newly created constituency of Altrincham and Sale West. Since its formation, Altrincham and Sale West has been represented in the House of Commons by the Conservative MP, Graham Brady. This is one of only four Conservative seats in Greater Manchester.

Geography

It lies in the northwest corner of the Cheshire Plain, just south of the River Mersey. The Bridgewater Canal passes through the Broadheath area of the town. Altrincham's drinking water is supplied by United Utilities. The local bedrock consists mainly of Keuper Waterstone, a type of sandstone, and water retrieved from those rocks is very hard and often saline, making it undrinkable. The town's climate is generally temperate, with few extremes of temperature or weather. The mean temperature is slightly above average for the United Kingdom; whereas both annual rainfall and average hours of sunshine are slightly below the average for the UK.

Along with Sale, Stretford and Urmston, Altrincham is one of the four major urban areas in Trafford. The Altrincham area, as defined by Trafford Council, comprises the south of Trafford. In addition to the town of Altrincham, it includes the villages of Timperley, Bowdon, Hale and Hale Barns. The Broadheath area of the town was a light industrial centre until the 1970s and is now a retail park. The most densely populated part of the town is around the town centre, with the less populated areas and more green space further from the centre of town in villages such as Bowdon and Hale. The Oldfield Brow area lies on the outskirts of the town beside the Bridgewater Canal and close to Dunham Massey.

Demography

As of the 2011 UK census, the town of Altrincham had a total population of 52,419. Of its 41,530 residents aged 16 and over, 62.1 per cent were couples living together.
The town's population density is 37.4 inhabitants per hectare, with the population consisting of 49.0% males and 51.0% females. Of those aged 16 and over, 15.2 per cent had no academic qualifications, similar to the 18.6 per cent in all of Trafford. At 8.4 percent, Altrincham has a low proportion of non-white people. Asians are the area's largest ethnic minority, at 4.9 per cent of the population.

In 1931, 14.6 per cent of Altrincham's population was middle class, slightly higher than the figure for England and Wales, which was 14 per cent. By 1971 this gap had increased to 28.8 per cent compared to 24 per cent nationally, while the town's working class population had declined, from 30.3 per cent in 1931 (36 per cent in England and Wales) to 18.6 per cent (26 per cent nationwide). The remainder comprised clerical and skilled manual workers. This change in social structure was similar to that seen across the nation – although biased towards the middle classes – making Altrincham the middle-class town it is today.

Population change
According to the hearth tax returns from 1664, the township of Altrincham had a population of about 636, making it the largest of the local settlements; this had increased to 1,692 in 1801. In the first half of the 19th century, the town's population increased by 165 per cent, higher than 89 per cent across England and 98 per cent in the Trafford area. The growth of the settlement was a result of the Industrial Revolution, and although Altrincham was one of the fastest-growing townships in the Trafford area, but paled in comparison to new industrial areas such as Ashton-under-Lyne, Hyde, and Manchester. In the second half of the 19th century, Altrincham's population grew by 275 per cent, higher than the 235 per cent for Trafford and 69 per cent nationally in the same period. This was due to the late industrialisation of the area and the introduction of the Manchester South Junction and Altrincham Railway in 1849.

Economy

Historically, Altrincham was a market town and the two main areas of employment were agriculture and market trade. Although the town went into decline in the 15th century, it recovered and the annual fairs lasted until the mid-19th century and the market still continues. During the Industrial Revolution, Altrincham grew as an industrial town, particularly the Broadheath area, which was developed into an industrial estate. In 1801 there were four cotton mills in Altrincham, although they had closed by the 1851 census. The decline of the textile industry in Altrincham mirrored the decline of the industry in the Trafford area as a result of a lack of investment and the development of more established industrial areas such as Manchester, Ashton-under-Lyne, and Oldham. During the late 19th and early 20th centuries, heavier industries moved into Broadheath, providing local employment. The area steadily declined during the second half of the 20th century, with employment at Broadheath falling from 8,000 to 5,000 between 1960 and 1970. Despite the presence of retailers such as Tesco, Sainsbury's and Marks & Spencer in the town, a new Asda superstore in Broadheath, and redevelopment schemes costing over £100 million, Altrincham's 15.5 per cent level of employment in retail is below the national average of 16.9 per cent. Altrincham, with its neighbours Bowdon and Hale, is said to constitute a "stockbroker belt", with well-appointed dwellings in an area of sylvan opulence.

The historic market town developed as a residential area in the 19th century although it retains its retail heritage in the Old Market Place (a conservation area) and a new pedestrianised shopping centre. The retail districts of the town have more recently fallen victim to decline due to competition from the nearby Trafford Centre and a regenerated Manchester city centre. In 2006 Trafford Metropolitan Borough Council unveiled plans for a £1.5 million redevelopment for the town centre.

Construction on Altair, a £100 million development on Oakfield Road, began in September 2019 after many years of delay. The scheme includes apartments, shops and eating places and will create a new public square linking it to the nearby Altrincham Interchange, which underwent a £19million refurbishment in 2015. A 2010 survey found that despite being in one of the country's most affluent areas, nearly a third of the shops in Altrincham were vacant; Trafford council attributed the high number (78) to the effects of the recession and plans to refurbish Stamford House, which left most of its shops unused.

According to the 2011 UK census, the main industries of employment of residents in Altrincham were wholesale and retail trade (14.8%), human health and social work activities (13.0%), and professional, scientific and technical activities (11.6%). The census recorded the economic inactivity of residents aged 16–74 as 3.5 per cent looking after home or family, 2.8 per cent long-term sick or disabled, 4.1 per cent students, and 1.5 per cent economically inactive for other reasons. The 3.1 per cent unemployment rate of Altrincham was low compared with the national rate of 4.4 per cent.

Culture

Landmarks and attractions

The Old Market Place is thought to stand on the site of the original town settlement. Now a registered conservation area it consists of a series of part timber-framed buildings echoing the wattle and daube constructions of the original houses and burgage plots. The cobblestone paving was replaced in 1896. The Buttermarket which stood in the area near the Old Market Place from the 17th century until the late 19th century was also the site for dispensing early local justice. A courtroom, stocks and whipping post saw public floggings take place there until the early 19th century. The whipping post and stocks were restored as a tourist attraction by local traders in the 1990s. However the Buttermarket area was also a site of religious importance, since prospective brides and grooms are thought to have declared their intentions here. In 1814 Thomas de Quincey described the Old Market Place in his Confessions of an English Opium Eater while travelling from Manchester to Chester. He noted how little the place had changed since his visit 14 years earlier at the age of three, and that "fruits, such as can be had in July, and flowers were scattered about in profusion: even the stalls of the butchers, from their brilliant cleanliness, appeared attractive: and bonny young women of Altrincham were all tripping about in caps and aprons coquettishly disposed"  In 1974 Altrincham artist George Allen was approached by Trafford Council to paint a picture of The Old Market Place. This picture was used to produce postcards which were sold to promote Altrincham, and are still sold today to raise funds for a local charity.
Another of Altrincham's attractions is the historic market, set up over 700 years ago when the town was first established.

Of the 21 conservation areas in Trafford, ten are in Altrincham: The Downs, The Devisdale, Bowdon, Ashley Heath, Goose Green, Old Market Place, Sandiway, George Street, the Linotype Housing Estate and Stamford New Road. On the town's outskirts is the 18th-century Dunham Massey Hall, surrounded by its  deer park, both now owned by the National Trust. The hall is early Georgian in style, and along with its stables and carriage house, is a Grade I listed building.

Royd House was built between 1914 and 1916, by local architect Edgar Wood, as his own residence. It has a flat concrete roof, a concave façade, and is faced in Portland red stone and Lancashire brick. It is regarded as one of the most advanced examples of early 20th-century domestic architecture, and is referenced in architectural digests. It has been a Grade I listed building since 1975, one of six such buildings in Trafford. The Grade II listed clock outside the main transport interchange was built in 1880.

The  Stamford Park was designed by landscape gardener John Shaw. It opened to the public in 1880, as a sports park with areas for cricket and football. The land was donated by George Grey, the 7th Earl of Stamford, and is now owned and run by Trafford Council. The park is listed as Grade II on the Register of Parks and Gardens of Special Historic Interest in England, and has won a bronze award from the Greenspace award scheme.

John Leigh Park, located in the area of Oldfield Brow, was the site of Oldfield Hall until 1917 when it fell into disrepair after being purchased by the Earl of Stamford. That year Mr John Leigh purchased the land from the widowed Countess of Stamford and gifted it to the local council to be used as a park for soldiers and workers. The park was named 'John Leigh Park' and opened on 22 July 1917.

Events and venues

Altrincham has its own music festival that takes place in August. The Goose Green Festival takes place over the August bank holiday weekend in the Goose Green area of Altrincham, and features a number of unsigned bands, local food and drink and entertainment for all the family. Founded in 2015, the two day festival attracts over 6000 visitors over the two days, and headline acts have included Prose, The Jade Assembly, The Rainband, Apollo Junction and Corella.
Altrincham has two theatres, the Altrincham Garrick Playhouse and the Club Theatre (latterly known as the Altrincham Little Theatre). The Altrincham Garrick group was formed in 1913. The Garrick held the world stage premier of Psycho in 1982. In 1998, it received a grant of £675,000 from the National Lottery as part of a £900,000 redevelopment of the theatre, which was completed in 1999. The Club Theatre group began in 1896, as the St Margaret's Church Institute Amateur Dramatics Society. It provides a venue for the Trafford Youth Theatre production each year, and it runs the Hale One Act Festival, an annual week-long event started in 1972. The club has received awards from both the Greater Manchester Drama Federation and the Cheshire Theatre Guild. Altrincham also had Greater Manchester's only Michelin starred restaurant, the Juniper.

Sport
Altrincham F.C., nicknamed The Robins, was founded in 1903 and play home matches at Moss Lane. The club plays in the National League. In the 1970s and 1980s, Altrincham F.C. built a reputation for giant-killing acts against Football League teams in FA Cup matches. The club has knocked out Football League opposition on a record 16 occasions, including a 1986 victory against top-flight Birmingham City. Altrincham won the forerunner of the Football Conference in its first two seasons, but was denied election to the Football League on both occasions, falling a single vote short in 1980. Altrincham have since had mixed fortunes. Relegated to the Northern Premier League in 1997, the club has since earned 5 promotions and suffered 5 relegations, most recently gaining promotion to the National League in the 2019-20 season. The club's main rivals are Macclesfield Town and Northwich Victoria.

Altrincham is one of the few towns in north-west England with an ice rink and has had an ice hockey team since 1961, when Altrincham Ice Rink was built in Broadheath. The Altrincham Aces (later renamed the Trafford Metros) played from 1961 until 2003, when Altrincham Ice Rink closed. The town then had a three-year period without a rink or ice hockey team, until construction of the 2,500 capacity Altrincham Ice Dome was completed. Manchester Phoenix, a club having a professional presence in the English Premier Ice Hockey League and an extensive junior development aspect, relocated to the Ice Dome during the 2006–07 season, having withdrawn from competition two years earlier due to the high cost of playing matches at Manchester's MEN Arena. In 2009, the Manchester Phoenix English National Ice Hockey League team was renamed Trafford Metros, bringing the old Altrincham team's name back into use. When not being used by Phoenix the Altrincham Ice Dome is open to the public for ice skating.

Founded in 1897, Altrincham Kersal RUFC plays rugby union. They have played at level 6 since being relegated from North One in 2012. Following the withdrawal of a number of Lancashire clubs from the county's union, they have been level transferred to play in the North Lancashire and Cumbria League for 2018–19. The club has produced England and Sale Sharks players Mark Cueto and Chris Jones and continues to produce players for the Sale Jets.

Altrincham and District Athletics Club was founded in 1961 and provides training facilities for track and field, road running, cross-country running and fell running.

Seamons Cycling Club was formed in 1948 in the area of Altrincham known locally as Seamons Moss.

Education

As Altrincham was part of the Bowdon parish, children from the township may have gone to the 16th-century school established at Bowdon; before that point, the town had no formal education system. A salt merchant from Dunham Woodhouses founded a school at Oldfield House intended for 40 boys aged 8–11 from the surrounding area. Sunday schools were set up in the late 18th and early 19th centuries. Altrincham's increasing population prompted the founding of more schools during the early 19th century and by 1856 the town had 9 schools, 1 college, and 23 teachers. The introduction of compulsory education during the second half of the 19th century increased the demand for schools, and by 1886 Altrincham had 12 church schools and 8 private schools.

Responsibility for local education fell to Cheshire County Council in 1903. Loreto Convent, the County High School for Girls, and Altrincham County High School for Boys, were founded in 1909, 1910, and 1912 respectively. Although still open these schools have since changed their names to Altrincham Grammar School for Girls, Altrincham Grammar School for Boys, and Loreto Grammar School. Altrincham received evacuees during the Second World War, and it was in this period that St. Ambrose College was founded.

Altrincham now has eighteen primary schools, one special school and eight secondary schools, including five grammar schools; the Trafford district maintains a selective education system assessed by entrance exams set by each school. Several of Altrincham's secondary schools have specialist status: Altrincham College (arts); Altrincham Grammar School for Boys (language); Altrincham Grammar School for Girls (language); Blessed Thomas Holford Catholic College (maths and computing); Loreto Grammar School (science and maths); and St. Ambrose College (maths and computing). Altrincham College of Arts, Altrincham Grammar School for Boys, Altrincham Grammar School for Girls, Blessed Thomas Holford Catholic College, Loreto Grammar School and St. Ambrose College were all rated as outstanding in 2011–12 Ofsted reports. Brentwood Special School is a mixed school for 11- to 19-year-olds who have special needs or learning difficulties.

Altrincham is home to one of the longest established, family-owned nursery schools in the UK, Oakfield Nursery School. Oakfield was voted 'UK Nursery of the Year' in 2014  and 'Best Individual Nursery' in 2008.

Religion

During the medieval and post-medieval periods the township of Altrincham was part of Bowdon parish. Low population density meant that the town did not have a church until the Anglican church established a chapel of ease in 1799. Nonconformists were also present in Altrincham; Methodists set up a chapel in 1790, and Baptists built one in the 1870s. Irish immigrants in the 1830s and 1840s also returned Roman Catholicism to the area, the first Roman Catholic church built in Altrincham being St Vincent's, in 1860.

Several churches in Altrincham are deemed architecturally important enough to be designated Grade II listed buildings. These are Christ Church, the Church of St Alban, the Church of St George, the Church of St John the Evangelist and Trinity United Reformed Church. Of the nine Grade II* listed buildings in Trafford, three are in Altrincham: the Church of St Margaret, the Church of St John the Divine and Hale Chapel in Hale Barns. As of the 2001 UK census, 78.8 per cent of Altrincham's residents reported themselves as being Christian, 1.1 per cent Jewish, 1.1 per cent Muslim, 0.4 per cent Hindu, 0.2 per cent Buddhist and 0.1 per cent Sikh. The census recorded 12.1 per cent as having no religion, 0.2 per cent with an alternative religion, while 6.1 per cent did not state a religion. Altrincham is in the Roman Catholic Diocese of Shrewsbury, and the Church of England Diocese of Chester. The nearest synagogue, belonging to Hale and District Hebrew Congregation, is on Shay Lane in Hale Barns.

Transport

Construction of the Manchester South Junction and Altrincham Railway began in 1845. The line was opened in October 1849, with  services from Manchester London Road via Sale to Altrincham. In 1931, it became one of Great Britain's first electrified railway lines, with a 1,500 V DC overhead line. At the same time, a new Altrincham station was opened on the same line, at Navigation Road, serving housing developments in the area. By 1937, 130 train services ran daily between Manchester and Altrincham. The line was renovated in the early 1990s to form part of the Manchester Metrolink light rail system. Broadheath railway station served the northern part of Altrincham between 1853 and 1962, on the line from Manchester, via Lymm, to Warrington.

Altrincham Interchange is one of the Metrolink's termini. The interchange was refurbished (2015–16) and now includes a brand new footbridge, with three lifts to cope with increased passenger demands, a larger-scale ticket office and a modern bus interchange. The Interchange connects the town to several locations in Greater Manchester, such as Sale and Bury; the service also includes Navigation Road station. Metrolink services leave around every six minutes, between 07:15 and 19:30 on weekdays and less frequently at other times. National Rail services link the Altrincham and Navigation Road stations with Chester (via Northwich) and with Manchester (via Stockport). Altrincham Interchange, next to the railway station, is a hub for local bus routes. There are plans to create a new link between Manchester Airport and the Mid-Cheshire Line, which Altrincham Interchange is a station on. Recently the Metrolink completed connections to this airport and opened the line 12 months early, but this is not a direct connection from the Metrolink line at Altrincham Interchange.

Notable people

The artist Helen Allingham, born in 1848, lived in Altrincham and then Bowdon during her childhood years. Abstract artist Jeremy Moon was born in Altrincham in 1934. The composer and music teacher John Ireland was born in Bowdon in 1879. Alison Uttley wrote the Little Grey Rabbit books while living in Bowdon. Dramatist Ronald Gow lived there in his youth and later taught at Altrincham Grammar School for Boys. The town was also the birthplace of the film and television actress Angela Cartwright. Ian Brown and John Squire of The Stone Roses both attended Altrincham Grammar School for Boys, and Paul Young of Sad Café and Mike and the Mechanics lived in Altrincham until his death in 2000.

Nick Estcourt, mountain climber, opened a climbing shop on Stamford New Road in Altrincham shortly before being swept to his death by an avalanche during an expedition to climb K2 in 1978 (the shop was subsequently run for many years by his wife, Carolyn). Estcourt was one of the closest friends of Chris Bonington, who lived for a time in Bowdon.

Hewlett Johnson, later known as the "Red Dean" of Canterbury, was curate, and later vicar of St Margaret's in the town from 1904 to 1924.

Footballer Jack Liggins was born here in 1906. The Lancashire and England Test cricketer Paul Allott was born in Altrincham.

Two Victoria Cross recipients were born at Altrincham. Edward Kinder Bradbury was born (16 August 1881) in the town, he was awarded the Victoria Cross for gallantry and ability in organising the defence of 'L' Battery against heavy odds at Nery on 1 September 1914 in World War I. Altrincham born Bill Speakman received the Victoria Cross for valour in 1951 in the Korean War.

Sir Michael Pollock, an officer in the Royal Navy who rose to the position of First Sea Lord, was born in Altrincham.

See also

Listed buildings in Altrincham

References
Notes

Bibliography

External links

 Altrincham History Society.

 
Towns in Greater Manchester
Market towns in Greater Manchester
Unparished areas in Greater Manchester
Geography of Trafford